The Ahom script or Tai Ahom Script, is an abugida that is used to write the Ahom language, a dormant Tai language undergoing revival spoken by the Ahom people till the late 18th-century, who established the Ahom kingdom and ruled the eastern part of the Brahmaputra valley between the 13th and the 18th centuries.  The old Ahom language today survives in the numerous manuscripts written in this script currently in institutional and private possession.

History 
The Ahom script was probably ultimately derived from the Indic, or Brahmi script, the root of almost all the Indic and Southeast Asian abugidas. It is probably of South Indic origin. The Brahmi script spread in a peaceful manner, Indianization, or the spread of Indian learning. It spread naturally to Southeast Asia, at ports on trading routes. At these trading posts, ancient inscriptions have been found in Sanskrit, using scripts that originated in India. At first, inscriptions were made in Indian languages, but later the scripts were used to write the local Southeast Asian languages. Hereafter, local varieties of the scripts were developed. By the 8th century, the scripts had diverged and separated into regional scripts. 

It is believed that the Ahom people adopted their script from either Old Mon or Old Burmese, in Upper Myanmar before migrating to the Brahmaputra Valley in the 13th century. This is supported based on similar shapes of characters between Ahom and Old Mon and Old Burmese scripts. It is clear, however, that the script and language would have changed during the few hundred years it was in use. The Lik Tai script featured on a 1407 Ming dynasty scroll exhibits many features of the Burmese script, including fourteen of the nineteen consonants, three medial diacritics and the high tone marker. According to the scholar Daniels, this shows that the Tai borrowed from the Burmese script to create their own script; the Lik Tai script was derived from the Burmese script, as it could only have been created by someone proficient in Burmese. Daniels also argues that, unlike previously thought, the Lik Tho Ngok script is not the origin of the other Lik Tai scripts, as the 1407 Lik Tai script shows greater similarity to the Ahom script, which has been attested earlier than the Lik Tho Ngok script. Other "Lik" scripts are used for the Khamti, Phake, Aiton and Tai Nuea languages, as well as for other Tai languages across Northern Myanmar and Assam, in Northeast India. The Lik scripts have a limited inventory of 16 to 18 consonant symbols compared to the Tai Tham script, which possibly indicates that the scripts were not developed for writing Pali. 

The earliest coins minted in the Ahom script and language were made during the reign of Subinphaa (1281-1293 AD). Samples of writing in the Ahom Script (Buranji's) remain stored in Assamese collections. The manuscripts were reportedly traditionally produced on paper prepared from agarwood (locally known as sachi) bark. Assamese replaced Ahom during the 17th century.

The Ahom script is no longer used by the Ahom people to read and write in everyday life. However, it retains cultural significance and is used for religious chants and to read literature. Ahom's literary tradition provides a window into the past, of Ahom's culture. A printed form of the font was developed in 1920, to be used in the first "Ahom-Assamese-English Dictionary".

Characteristics 
Like most abugidas, each letter has an inherent vowel of /a/. Other vowels are indicated by using diacritics, which can appear above, below, to the left, or to the right of the consonant. The script does not, however, indicate tones used in the language. The Ahom script is further complicated as it contains inconsistencies; a consonant may be written once in a word, but pronounced twice, common words may be shortened, and consecutive words with the same initial consonant may be contracted.

Consonants

The following medial consonant diacritics are used to form consonant clusters with /l/ and /r/, such as /kl/ and /kr/.

Vowels
The following vowel diacritics are added to an initial consonant:

To write a consonant without a vowel, the virama  is used.

Punctuation
The following characters are used for punctuation:

Numerals
The Ahom script contains its own set of numerals:

Unicode

Ahom script was added to the Unicode Standard in June, 2015 with the release of version 8.0. The Ahom block was expended by 16 code points with Unicode 14.0.

The Unicode block for Ahom is U+11700–U+1174F:

See also 
 List of writing systems
 Ahom people
 Ahom kingdom
 All Tai Ahom Students Union

Notes

References

External links 
 Entry on Ahom at Omniglot.com -- A guide to writing systems

Brahmic scripts
Culture of Assam
Obsolete writing systems
Ahom kingdom